Should a Doctor Tell? is a 1923 Australian silent film directed by P. J. Ramster and Alexander Butler. It is a high society melodrama about a man forced to be inspected by a doctor prior to his marriage, who discovers he has venereal disease.

It is considered a lost film.

Plot
Dr Aubrey Mather, an advocate for compulsory medical examinations for both the sexes prior to marriage, consents to the marriage of his daughter, Dorothy, to Count Delvo, on condition that he can present a clean bill of health. The Count is revealed to have a general disease. His doctor, Stirling Worth (Fred Oppey), advises him to postpone the wedding but the Count wants to go ahead and tells Dr Worth to remain silent. Worth is in love with Dorothy but agrees to take a bribe and not tell to care for his sick mother. But later, haunted by images of her having a crippled child, he ends up telling on Dr Mather about his patient on the day of the wedding. The Count shoots Dr Worth and he dies in Dorothy's arms.

Cast
Fred Oppey as Dr Stirling Worth
Thelma Newling
Verna Haines
Anne Parsons
Teddy Austin as Bennie the cripple

Production
The majority of the cast was drawn from Ramster's acting school. The censor passed the storyline because of its moral tone.

Reception
The film was Ramster's most popular.

References

External links

Should a Doctor Tell? at National Film and Sound Archive

1923 films
Australian drama films
Australian silent feature films
Australian black-and-white films
Films directed by Alexander Butler
Lost Australian films
1923 drama films
Melodrama films
1923 lost films
Lost drama films
Silent drama films